National Highway 844, commonly referred to as NH 844 is a national highway in India. It is a secondary route of National Highway 44.  NH-844 starts from Neraluru Thirumagondanahalli Village near Shri Ramanamaharshi ashrama, Bengaluru state of Karnataka and ends in Dharmapuri district of Tamil Nadu in India.

Route 
NH 844 connects Neraluru village of Bengaluru, Karnataka and pass via Upkar Spring Fields layout and connects Hosur and Adiyamankottai, Dharmapuri in the state of Tamil Nadu.

Junctions  

  Terminal near Hosur.
  Terminal near Adiyamankottai, Dharmapuri

See also 
 List of National Highways in India
 List of National Highways in India by state

References

External links 

 NH 844 on OpenStreetMap

National highways in India
National Highways in Tamil Nadu